Blåbreahøe is a mountain on the border of Vågå Municipality and Lom Municipality in Innlandet county, Norway. The mountain is surrounded by several other notable mountains including Veotinden and Styggehøbretindan to the north; Surtningssuoksle to the east; Surtningssue and Gloptinden to the southeast; Reinstinden, Raudhamran, and Hinnotefjellet to the southwest; Store Hellstugutinden, Nestsøre Hellstugutinden, and Søre Hellstugutinden to the west; and Austre Memurutinden and Store Memurutinden to the northwest.

See also
List of mountains of Norway by height

References

Jotunheimen
Vågå
Lom, Norway
Mountains of Innlandet